"Salvation is Created" is a choral work composed by Pavel Chesnokov in 1912 as the fifth in his Ten Communion Hymns (Op. 25). It was one of the last sacred works he composed before he turned to secular arts when the Soviet government began to suppress Christianity. Although he never heard his own composition performed, his children had the opportunity following his death. "Salvation is Created'" was originally published in 1913 by J. Fischer and Bro. and its popularity drove editors to produce many different versions in both Russian and English. Scored for six voices (SATTBB), the work is a communion hymn based on a synodal Kievan chant melody and Psalm 74 (73 in the Greek version).  The original Church Slavonic text is as follows:
Russian Script: Cпасение coдeлaл еси посреде земли, Боже. Аллилуия.
Latin Alphabet: Spaséniye sodélal yesí posredé ziemlí, Bózhe. Allilúiya.
English: Salvation is made in the midst of the earth, O God. Alleluia.
(Tchesnokov 2002)

The keys of B minor and D major are the work's primary key centers, and it is cast in AA’ or two part strophic form.

Band setting

Arranged in 1957 by Bruce Houseknecht, a wind band arrangement is considered a standard in the literature. Form, phrasing, and meter are all unaltered in the arrangement, but the key was changed to C minor and E-flat major for playability and intonation purposes.

References
 Rommereim, J. C. "'The Choir and How to Direct It:' Pavel Chesnokov's magnum opus." CHORAL JOURNAL, Official Publication of the American Choral Directors Association XXXVIII, no. 7 (1998): 29-42.
 Tchesnokov, Pavel. "Salvation is Created (Pavel Tchesnokov)." Choral Public Domain Library. Two editions. http://www.choralwiki.org/wiki/index.php/Salvation_is_created_(Pavel_Chesnokov) (accessed February 15, 2011).

1912 compositions
Choral compositions
Concert band pieces